The 1966 Iowa State Senate elections took place as part of the biennial 1966 United States elections. Iowa voters elected state senators in 32 of the state senate's 61 districts. At this time, the Iowa Senate still had several multi-member districts. State senators serve four-year terms in the Iowa State Senate.

The Iowa Senate was expanded from 59 to 61 members and new district maps were drawn for the 1966 election. The Iowa General Assembly provides statewide maps of each district.

The primary election on September 6, 1966, determined which candidates appeared on the November 8, 1966 general election ballot.

Following the previous election, Democrats had control of the Iowa state Senate with 34 seats to Republicans' 25 seats.

To claim control of the chamber from Democrats, the Republicans needed to net 6 Senate seats.

Democrats maintained control of the Iowa State Senate following the 1966 general election with the balance of power shifting to Democrats holding 32 seats and Republicans having 29 seats (a net gain of 4 seats for Republicans and net loss of 2 seats for Democrats).

Summary of Results
Note: The 29 holdover Senators not up for re-election are listed here with asterisks (*).

Source:

Detailed Results
32 of the 61 Iowa Senate seats were up for election in 1966.

Note: If a district does not list a primary, then that district did not have a competitive primary (i.e., there may have only been one candidate file for that district).

District 1

District 6

District 7

District 8

District 9

District 13
The 13th was a 2-member district following the 1966 election. Subdistrict No. 2 was held by holdover Senator Klefstad.

District 14

District 15
The 15th was a 2-member district following the 1966 election. Subdistrict No. 1 was held by holdover Senator Cassidy.

District 16

District 18

District 19

District 20
The 20th was a 5-member district following the 1966 election. Subdistrict No. 1 was held by holdover Senator Reppert. Subdistrict No. 4 held an election for a two-year term; whereas, subdistricts Nos. 2, 3, & 5 held elections for four-year terms.

Election for a two-year term in subdistrict No. 4.

District 22

District 23

District 24
The 24th was a 3-member district following the 1966 election. Subdistrict No. 1 was held by holdover Senator Ely. Subdistricts Nos. 2 & 3 held elections.

District 25

District 27

District 29

District 30
The 30th was a 2-member district following the 1966 election. Both subdistricts Nos. 1 & 2 held elections.

District 32
The 32nd was a 3-member district following the 1966 election. Subdistrict No. 3 had a holdover Senator Condon. Subdistricts Nos. 1 & 2 held elections.

District 33

District 34

District 36

District 37
The 37th was a 2-member district following the 1966 election. Subdistrict No. 1 held a special election for a two-year term. Subdistrict No. 2 held an election for a four-year term. 

Subdistrict No. 2 held an election for a four-year term.

District 40

See also
 United States elections, 1966
 United States House of Representatives elections in Iowa, 1966
 Elections in Iowa

References

1966 Iowa elections
Iowa Senate
Iowa Senate elections